Veselin Vachev (born 1 April 1973) is a Bulgarian former footballer who played as a defender. 

His first club was Spartak Pleven. He plays in the centre of defense, when there are corners or free kicks he joins his teammates in attack.

Awards
 Holder of the Bulgarian Cup 2000 (with PFC Levski Sofia)
 Champion of Bulgaria 2000 (with PFC Levski Sofia)

References

External links
 Profile at LevskiSofia.info

Bulgarian footballers
1973 births
Living people
Association football defenders
First Professional Football League (Bulgaria) players
PFC Spartak Pleven players
PFC Levski Sofia players
PFC Slavia Sofia players
PFC Cherno More Varna players
PFC Kaliakra Kavarna players
Sportspeople from Pleven